Events in the year 1821 in Mexico.

Incumbents
 Regent-Agustín de Iturbide

Events
 February 24 – Army of the Three Guarantees formed
 August 24 – Mexico gains its independence from Spain from ratifying the Treaty of Córdoba.
 September 28 – The Declaration of Independence of the Mexican Empire is ratified.
 September 29 – Agustín de Iturbide is proclaimed as the President of the Regency.

Deaths
Maria Fermina Rivera, Heroine of Mexican War of Independence (exact date unknown)

 
Years of the 19th century in Mexico